Maxentius is a genus of insect in the subfamily Stenopelmatinae and formerly treated as a subgenus of the genus Sia.  Species can be found in sub-Saharan Africa.

Species
 Maxentius canus (Péringuey, 1916)
 Maxentius kuhlgatzi (Karny, 1910)
 Maxentius pallidus (Walker, 1869)
 Maxentius pinguis (Walker, 1869)

References 

Ensifera genera
Stenopelmatoidea